The 2015 TaxSlayer Bowl was an American college football bowl game played on January 2, 2015, at EverBank Field in Jacksonville, Florida.  The 70th edition of the Gator Bowl featured the Iowa Hawkeyes from the Big Ten Conference and the Tennessee Volunteers of the Southeastern Conference. The game was one of the 2014–15 NCAA football bowl games that concluded the 2014 NCAA Division I FBS football season. The game began at 3:20 p.m. EST and was nationally televised by ESPN. It was sponsored by tax preparation software company TaxSlayer.com, and for sponsorship reasons was officially known as the TaxSlayer Bowl.

Teams
This was the third overall meeting between these two teams, with the series tied 1–1. The previous time these two teams met was in 1987. The only other bowl game these two played against each other was the 1982 Peach Bowl, which Iowa won 28–22.

The Volunteers took the momentum early, scoring on their first four possessions and leading 28–0 before Iowa managed to reach 70 yards.  Sophomore quarterback and game MVP Joshua Dobbs ran for two touchdowns and threw for another as the Vols posted their first winning season since going 7–6 in 2009, and earned its first postseason victory since the Phillip Fulmer era, the last being the 2008 Outback Bowl over the Wisconsin Badgers.

Game summary

Scoring summary

Source:

Statistics

References

TaxSlayer Bowl
Gator Bowl
Iowa Hawkeyes football bowl games
Tennessee Volunteers football bowl games
January 2015 sports events in the United States
TaxSlayer Bowl
21st century in Jacksonville, Florida